Paredones is a Chilean town and commune in Cardenal Caro Province, O'Higgins Region.

Demographics
Of these, 2,195 (32.8%) lived in urban areas and 4,500 (67.2%) in rural areas. The population grew by 1.1% (73 persons) between the 1992 and 2002 censuses.

Administration
As a commune, Paredones is a third-level administrative division of Chile administered by a municipal council, headed by an alcalde who is directly elected every four years. The 2021-2024 alcalde is Antonio Carvacho Vargas.

See also 
 Bucalemu

References

External links
  Municipality of Paredones

Communes of Chile
Populated places in Cardenal Caro Province